The 2011 Washington State Cougars football team represented Washington State University in the 2011 NCAA Division I FBS football season. The team was coached by fourth year head coach Paul Wulff and played their home games at Martin Stadium in Pullman, Washington. They are members of the North Division of the Pac-12 Conference. They finished the season 4–8, 2–7 in Pac-12 play to finish in last place in the North Division.

At the end of the season, head coach Paul Wulff was fired after going 9–40 in four seasons. Former Texas Tech head coach Mike Leach took over in 2012.

Schedule

Game summaries

Idaho State

Washington State backup quarterback Marshall Lobbestael threw for 230 yards and two touchdowns as Washington State defeated Idaho State 64–21 on September 3. Starting quarterback Jeff Tuel only played one series in the game due to a break in his clavicle that occurred at an unknown point in the game, and he missed the opening series of the game because of a stomach virus. Despite the injury, Washington State scored on its first four possessions against the Bengals, and they built a 23–0 lead in the first quarter and a 40–0 lead by halftime. After the Cougars took a 47–0 lead in the third quarter, Idaho State scored when running back Jahmel Rover ran in from 3 yards to cap a 73-yard drive. Rover ran in a second touchdown with 4:21 left in the third to bring Idaho State within 54–14. The game was the first time the Cougars scored 60 or more points in a game since a 63–37 win over Southwest Louisiana in 1997.

UNLV

San Diego State

Colorado

UCLA

UCLA leads Washington State 38–18–1 in this series started in 1928. At the Rose Bowl, the Bruins are 8–5 on the Cougars.

Stanford

Homecoming

Oregon State

Oregon

California

Arizona State

Utah

Senior Day

Washington

References

Washington State
Washington State Cougars football seasons
Washington State Cougars football